The Dresbachian is a Maentwrogian regional stage of North America, lasting from 501 to 497 million years ago. It is part of the Upper Cambrian and is defined by four trilobite zones. It overlaps with the ICS-stages Guzhangian, Paibian and the lowest Jiangshanian.

The Dresbachian overlies the Middle Cambrian Albertan series, and is the lowest stage of the Upper Cambrian Croixian series, followed by the Franconian stage.  The Dresbachian extinction event, about 502 million years ago, was followed by the Cambrian–Ordovician extinction event about  million years ago.

Naming
The term is derived from the town of Dresbach which is located in southeastern Minnesota on the Mississippi River.

Definition
The Dresbachian is defined by four trilobite zones: Cedaria-, Crepicephalus-, Aphelaspis- and Dunderbergia trilobite zones.

Events
The Dresbachian extinction event during the Late Cambrian was the second of two severe extinctions during the first period of the Paleozoic era; the first being the End-Botomian extinction event during the Middle Cambrian. According to data on extinction intensity (see below), both extinction events slashed approximately 40 percent of marine genera. However, the two are poorly documented due to a paucity of fossil evidence so early in the evolution of life.

References
 
 Chen Jun-yuan & Teichert C, 1983; "Cambrian Cephalopods", Geology Vol 11, pp647–650, Nov 1983
 Flower R.H.1964,  The Nautiloid Order Ellesmerocerida (Cephalopoda) Menoir 12, New Mexico Bureau of Mines and Mineral Resources, Socorro, NM
Harland, W. B. et al. 1990. A Geologic Time Scale 1989. Cambridge University Press, Cambridge . Ref in Paleobiology Database on line.
 Moore, Lalicker, and Fischer 1952; Invertebrate Fossils; McGraw-Hill; fig 1-17.
 Geowhen database. 

Cambrian geochronology
Cambrian United States
Cambrian North America
Extinction events
Cambrian Minnesota
Guzhangian
Paibian
Jiangshanian